Adela Paulina Baltoi (born 19 September 1992) is a Romanian long-distance runner. In 2020, she competed in the women's half marathon at the 2020 World Athletics Half Marathon Championships held in Gdynia, Poland.

References

External links 
 

Living people
1992 births
Place of birth missing (living people)
Romanian female long-distance runners
Romanian female marathon runners